Newtown Unthank is a hamlet in the Hinckley and Bosworth district of Leicestershire about  west of Leicester. It is in the civil parish of Desford  and about a mile northeast of the village.

Newtown Unthank was the site of Desford railway station on the Leicester and Swannington Railway, which became part of the Leicester to Burton-upon-Trent Line.

External links

Hamlets in Leicestershire
Hinckley and Bosworth